Eleazar Rodgers (born 22 January 1985) is a South African professional footballer who last played as a forward for Cape Town All Stars United. He has represented South Africa at senior international level. He is from Kuils River in the Western Cape.

Rodgers made his international debut for South Africa in 2007 against Malawi.

References

External links
 
 

1985 births
Living people
Cape Coloureds
South African soccer players
South Africa international soccer players
Sportspeople from Cape Town
Association football forwards
Santos F.C. (South Africa) players
Mamelodi Sundowns F.C. players
Cape Town Spurs F.C. players
Platinum Stars F.C. players
Bidvest Wits F.C. players
Free State Stars F.C. players
Cape Umoya United F.C. players
South African Premier Division players
National First Division players